"I've Got News for You" is a song by Irish singer Feargal Sharkey, released in 1991 as the first single from his third studio album Songs from the Mardi Gras. It was written by Sharkey and Dennis Morgan, and produced by Barry Beckett. The song reached No. 12 in the UK and No. 8 in Ireland.

A music video was filmed to promote the single, while Sharkey also performed the song on the UK TV music show Top of The Pops. The B-side, "I Can't Begin to Stop", was exclusive to the single. It was also written by Sharkey and Morgan, and produced by Beckett.

Critical reception
Upon its release, Tim Peacock of Sounds described "I've Got News for You" as "a wishy-washy afterhours ballad of the first water". He added, "Admittedly, Feargal sounds like he's given it all he's got, but despite a gargantuan sax solo, this just drifts around like an ageing lounge lizard. Sad." Julian Cope of New Musical Express considered it "really duff" with a lyric that "doesn't make much sense". John Mangan of The Age commented, "This one is a syrupy ballad with more than a hint of the '50s. It's agonisingly predictable, but your man does have a decent voice." Evening Herald stated, "Despite the obvious pop appeal of his pristine single "I've Got News for You", [Sharkey's] album is shockingly ordinary." Music & Media wrote, "Sharkey comes back stronger than before. A soul-jewel."

Formats

Chart performance

Personnel
 Feargal Sharkey – lead vocals, producer of "You Little Thief (Special Remix)"
 Barry Beckett – producer of "I've Got News for You" and "I Can't Begin to Stop"
 Alan Beukers – front cover photography
 Roger Taylor, David Richards – producers of "Loving You"
 David A. Stewart – producer of "A Good Heart"

References

1991 singles
Feargal Sharkey songs
Pop ballads
1991 songs
Virgin Records singles
Song recordings produced by Barry Beckett
Songs written by Dennis Morgan (songwriter)